Gimme is a 1923 American comedy silent black and white film directed by Rupert Hughes and starring Helene Chadwick and May Wallace. This film along with Charge It (1921) and Ladies Must Dress (1927) encouraged women to be flappers and to increase their consumerism.

Plot
As described in a film magazine, Fanny Daniels (Chadwick), after a short, successful career as a designer for Claude Lambert's (Imboden) establishment, meets, falls in love with, and marries wealthy young man Clinton Ferris (Glass). She had borrowed $500 from Claude to buy her trousseau for the wedding and now Claude demands its return. Fanny, embarrassed and unable to reconcile her former financial independence with asking her husband for money, goes back to work for Claude while Clinton is away on a trip. She uses a blank check given her by her husband to clear up her indebtedness with Claude, which puts Clinton in a financial hole. When he returns, he assumes the worst regarding the check and they quarrel and Fanny leaves. The marital difficulty is cleared up when Clinton discovers that Fanny is not and has never been romantically involved with Claude. The couple reconcile and agree to live on a fifty-fifty financial basis.

Cast

Reception
Exhibitor's Trade Review praised Gimme as having a "thoroughly modern" theme involving a situation that could arise in any home and stated that a theater audience "got" the film.

Preservation
With no prints of Gimme located in any film archives it is a lost film.

References

External links

Silent American comedy films
1923 comedy films
1923 films
American silent feature films
American black-and-white films
Films directed by Rupert Hughes
Films based on works by Rupert Hughes
1920s American films